The Elks Club Building is a historic site in Jacksonville, Florida. It is located at 201-213 North Laura Street. As its name implies, it was once a headquarters for the local chapter of The Elks. On March 9, 2000, it was added to the U.S. National Register of Historic Places, because of the historic influence of Elks establishments in the United States communities.

References

External links
 
 Duval County listings at National Register of Historic Places
 Elks Club Building at Florida's Office of Cultural and Historical Programs

Buildings and structures in Jacksonville, Florida
History of Jacksonville, Florida
National Register of Historic Places in Jacksonville, Florida
Elks buildings
Clubhouses in Florida
Northbank, Jacksonville
Laura Street